Aloha Golf Club is a golf club, located 3 kilometres inland from Puerto Banús and 8 kilometres west of Marbella, Andalusia, Spain. It hosted the Andalucian Open on the European Tour in 2007, 2008 and 2012, and the Spanish Women's Open on the Ladies European Tour in 2016 and 2019.

The Aloha Golf Club was established in 1975 and in 2005 celebrated its 30th anniversary with a dinner gala dance. It is a private members' club, guests of members and guests of the Club are welcomed but from 2023 members of the public are no longer admitted.

Course
The Javier Arana designed golf course has a total length of 6246 metres and is noted for its narrow tree-lined fairways and numerous lakes and streams.

The names of the holes are as follows:

Miguel Angel Jimenez 
Uresandi
Los Olivos
Cortavitarte
La Fuente
Prunus-Prisard
El Ruedo
Penablanca
El Jorobado
Javier Arana
Las Aguilas
Cuidiao
El Algarrobo
Curlucho
Camino Ronda
Cancionero
Obelix
Vistos

References

External links
Official site

Golf clubs and courses in Spain
Buildings and structures in Marbella
Sports venues completed in 1975
Sports venues in Andalusia
1975 establishments in Spain